A ferret is a domesticated animal.

Ferret may also refer to:

Animals
 Black-footed ferret, a wild animal from North America

Entertainment and media
 Ferret (comics), a Timely Comics character
 The Ferret (film), a 1950 French film
 The Ferret (news), a media cooperative in Scotland
 The Ferret (TV series), a Welsh consumer affairs programme
 Ferret Music, an American record label
 The Ferrets (band), an Australian pop/rock band
 Matelo Ferret ((1918–1989), gypsy jazz guitarist and composer
 Sarane Ferret (1912–1970), gypsy jazz guitarist and composer
 Baro Ferret (1908–1978), gypsy jazz guitarist and composer

Military
 Fairey Ferret, a British biplane
 Ferret armoured car, a British-produced fighting vehicle
 HMS Ferret, the name of a number of ships and shore establishments of the Royal Navy

Places
 Val Ferret, a valley on the Swiss side of the Mont Blanc Massif
 Cap Ferret, a headland on France's Atlantic coast

See also
 Féret (disambiguation)
 Ferrette, a commune in north-eastern France